Xylophanes anubus is a moth of the family Sphingidae first described by Pieter Cramer in 1777.

Distribution 
It is found in Suriname, Mexico, Belize, Nicaragua, Costa Rica and south to Brazil, Bolivia and Argentina.

Description 
The wingspan is 97–102 mm. Females are larger than males. It is a very variable species in terms of size and degree of development of the oblique lines of the forewing upperside. The costal margin of the forewing is often rather strongly convex and the apex is recurved. The abdomen has three dorsal lines, the median line is usually the most distinct but may be absent and the lateral lines are sometimes reduced to rows of dots. The forewing upperside is either with or without a dark cloud distal to discal cell. There are seven oblique lines present of which the third is the heaviest.

Biology 
Adults are on wing year round in Costa Rica.

The larvae feed on Psychotria panamensis, Psychotria chiapensis, Psychotria psychotriifolia, Psychotria nervosa and Garrobo species. They often eat half or part of a leaf and then move to a different leaf. The first and second instars are green, changing to mottled brown or almost black at the third instar. Most feeding takes place after dusk and larvae often hide in leaf rolls or under a branch during the day.

References

External links
Xylophanes anubus anubus at Silkmoths. Archived from the original May 13, 2006.

anubus
Moths described in 1777
Moths of South America